The 13rd Gaudí Awards, organised by the Catalan Film Academy, were presented at the 's auditorium in Barcelona on 21 March 2021.

History 
The nominations were read by Sergi López and Aina Clotet at La Pedrera's auditorium on 28 January 2021. The Barcelona Vampiress grossed the highest number of nominations, 14.

In addition to the regular awards, Les dues nits d'ahir received the Public's Choice Special Award (which was presented at Calella's Sala Mozart rather than at the CCIB), whereas actress Carme Elías was recognised with the honorary life achievement award.

Winners and nominees 
The winners and nominees are listed as follows:
{| class=wikitable style="width="100%"
|-
| style="vertical-align:top;" width="50%"| 
 The Barcelona Vampiress
 The Offering
 
 
| style="vertical-align:top;" width="50%"| 
 Schoolgirls
 Adú
 Rosa's Wedding
 The People Upstairs
|-
| style="vertical-align:top;" width="50%"| 
 Pilar Palomero — Schoolgirls
 Cesc Gay — The People Upstairs
 Icíar Bollaín — Rosa's Wedding
  — The Barcelona Vampiress
| style="vertical-align:top;" width="50%"| 
  — 
 Cesc Gay — The People Upstairs
 Icíar Bollaín, Alicia Luna — Rosa's Wedding
 Pilar Palomero — Schoolgirls
|-
| style="vertical-align:top;" width="50%"| 
 Candela Peña — Rosa's Wedding
 Andrea Fandos — Schoolgirls
 Anna Alarcón — The Offering
 Nora Navas — The Barcelona Vampiress
| style="vertical-align:top;" width="50%"| 
 Mario Casas — Cross the Line
 Alex Brendemühl — The Offering
 David Verdaguer — One for All
 Javier Cámara — The People Upstairs
|-
| style="vertical-align:top;" width="50%"| 
 Verónica Echegui — The Offering
 Bruna Cusí — The Barcelona Vampiress
 Natalia de Molina — Schoolgirls
 Núria Prims — The Barcelona Vampiress
| style="vertical-align:top;" width="50%"| 
 Alberto San Juan — The People Upstairs
  — 
 Francesc Orella — The Barcelona Vampiress
 Ernesto Alterio — I Love You, Stupid
|-
| style="vertical-align:top;" width="50%"| 
 
 ¿Puedes oírme?
 La mami
 The Mystery of the Pink Flamingo
| style="vertical-align:top;" width="50%"| 
 
 Candela
 Forastera
 Panteres
 Vera
|-
| style="vertical-align:top;" width="50%"| 
 
 Èxode
 El crèdit
 La fossa
| style="vertical-align:top;" width="50%"| 
  — Schoolgirls
 Bet Rourich — One for All
 Josep M. Civit — Baby
 Josep M. Civit — The Barcelona Vampiress
|-
| style="vertical-align:top;" width="50%"| 
 Luis Fernández, Anna Parra — Adú
 David Masllorens i Silva — The Barcelona Vampiress
 Ester Velasco — Cross the Line
 Uriel Wisnia — Schoolgirls

| style="vertical-align:top;" width="50%"| 
  — The Barcelona Vampiress
 Anna Pujol — The People Upstairs
 Balter Gallart — Cross the Line
 Mónica Bernuy — Schoolgirls
|-
| style="vertical-align:top;" width="50%"| 
 , Cristóbal Fernández — 
 Ana Pfaff — La mami
 Bernat Aragonés — A stormy night
 Sofi Escudé — Schoolgirls
| style="vertical-align:top;" width="50%"| 
  — Niños somos todos
 Alfred Tapscott — The Barcelona Vampiress
 Carlos Naya — Schoolgirls
 Roque Baños — Adú
|-
| style="vertical-align:top;" width="50%"| 
 Mercè Paloma — The Barcelona Vampiress
 Anna Güell — The People Upstairs
 Arantxa Ezquerro — Schoolgirls
 Patricia Monné — Adú
| style="vertical-align:top;" width="50%"| 
 Amanda Villavieja, Fernando Novillo, Alejandra Molina — Schoolgirls Albert Gay, Irene Rausell, Yasmina Praderas — The People Upstairs
 Daniela Fermín, Quique López,  Carlos Jiménez — The Barcelona Vampiress
 Elena Coderch, Laura Tomás, Yasmina Praderas — Cross the Line
|-
| style="vertical-align:top;" width="50%"| 
 Lluís Rivera, Anna Aragonès, Aleix Torrecillas — The Barcelona Vampiress Esther Ballesteros, Luis Tinoco — Cross the Line
 Lluís Rivera, Àlex Villagrasa — The Occupant
 Raúl Romanillos, Míriam Piquer — Adú
| style="vertical-align:top;" width="50%"| 
 Laura Pérez, Xavi Valverde — The Barcelona Vampiress Amparo Sánchez — Rosa's Wedding
 Carmen Arbués — Schoolgirls
 Patricia Reyes — Cross the Line
|-
| colspan = "2" style="vertical-align:top;" width="100%"| 
 Sorry We Missed You About Endlessness
 
 Little Joe
|}

 Public's Choice Special Award 
 '''

Honorary Award 

Actress Carme Elías was selected as the recipient of the Gaudí honorary award.

References 

Gaudí Awards
2021 in Catalonia
2021 film awards
21st century in Barcelona
March 2021 events in Spain